is an arcade-style baseball video game for the Sega Mega Drive released exclusively in Japan.

Summary
This video game features super deformed Pawapuro-like characters along with all twelve teams from the Nippon Professional Baseball League's 1995 season. There is an option for simplified play and games as little as three innings.

Reception
On release, Famicom Tsūshin scored the game a 23 out of 40.

References

1995 video games
Japan-exclusive video games
Nippon Professional Baseball video games
Sega Genesis games
Sega Genesis-only games
Video games developed in Japan